A radio-controlled submarine is a scale model of a submarine that can be steered via radio control. The most common form are those operated by hobbyists. These can range from inexpensive toys to complex projects involving sophisticated electronics. Oceanographers and military units also operate radio-controlled submarines.

Radio transmission through water 
As the conductivity of a medium increases, the more a radio signal passing through it is attenuated. High frequencies are also attenuated more than low frequencies, and tend to reflect off the surface of the water more. As is well known communication with military submarines uses very low frequency electromagnetic radiation for this reason. Military frequencies are well below allocated hobby radio control bands, but the lowest hobby bands - typically around 27MHz/40MHz - can penetrate several feet of water at short distances, typically less than 45 meters. Penetration at these frequencies is easier in fresh water, but are difficult to impossible in sea water. Modern radio control sets using the 2.4GHz band penetrate water very poorly, and are thus not used by serious divers.

For underwater radio to work, even at these frequencies, the receiving aerial needs to be completely insulated from the surrounding water. Plastic covered wire provides adequate insulation - the aerial need not be held in an airtight container - but the cut end of such wire must be sealed against water ingress. Depending on water conditions, positive control can be maintained at perhaps 3 meters depth.

Since control of model submarines may not be reliable at all times, such models usually carry a variety of apparatus intended to prevent model loss. Fail-safe systems which detect loss of signal and command the submarine to surface, or pressure sensors which limit the depth attained, may be used. Such specialist complexity usually makes a model submarine an expensive item compared to a model surface boat.

Professional or military remote-controlled diving equipment may be controlled via a tether, or by using sound signals. Quite commonly, such equipment has onboard computers which allow autonomous operation following a set path, so continuous communication with the controlling base is not necessary. The advent of small cheap computers such as the Raspberry Pi or Arduino has allowed model submariners to emulate their professional brethren and provide autonomous control in situations where radio transmission or adequate visibility is lacking.

Hobby Submarines

Dynamic diving 
Models with dynamic diving are positively buoyant, and will remain on the surface until sufficient thrust is generated over their control surfaces to force them down beneath the water. Dynamic diving models are both the cheapest and simplest designed models available, as complicated buoyancy control systems are replaced by diving planes or thrusters. Dynamic dive models also have the advantage of being able to return to the surface if radio contact is lost, due to their positive buoyancy. However, as they are positively buoyant, such models must maintain sufficient speed while underwater to remain there, and are unable to stop without rising to the surface. Some modelers may also argue that the speed required to submerge such models is not to scale and that they may dive too quickly.

Static diving 
Models with static diving have the ability to alter their displacement by taking on or pumping out water. This can be accomplished through the use of a piston, inflatable bladder, or through a ballast tank. Boats that use a ballast tank generally fill the tank by opening a vent at the top, and force the water out by using compressed gas. There are variants that use water pumps for both processes. A liquid gas is dosed into the ballast tank to push water out. Gas-Snort Liquid gas is used to surface the boat in an emergency, otherwise the ballast tank is blown by the use of a snorkel tube at periscope depth and the boat is trimmed to surface to periscope depth with a full ballast tank. RCABS -Recirculated Compressed Air Ballast System. Originally developed by Darnell (UK) in the 1950s, this system uses a rubber bladder as the ballast tank and this is filled with compressed air supplied by a small compressor. The air is taken from the water-tight container (WTC) aft dry space to inflate the bladder.

Another system gaining popularity is the 'Snort System'. A ballast tank allows water to enter by releasing a vent valve on the top of the cylinder, allowing the boat to submerge. To surface, a small pump 'Snorts' air from the snorkel tube in the conning tower (sail) into the ballast tank, expelling the water. This system is also equipped with a small tank of compressed gas, which in the event of a fail-safe system operating, usually due to loss of radio signal, the gas is released into the ballast tank, surfacing the boat.

In Europe, the piston tank is the ballast system of choice. These models can become very expensive to build due to the complexity of their ballast systems. In the event of a loss of radio contact while submerged, the boat will most likely sink to the bottom and require manual retrieval, unless equipped with a fail safe system. However, the ability to dive while at a stand still has its advantages, as it can be more precise and scale like than dynamic systems.

References

External links
 The SubCommittee
Submarine modelers Forum
Explorer sub made from PVC pipe
R/C Model Submarines & Submersible Video Platforms

Submarine
Robotic submarines